Per Fredrik Ture Person (23 November 1892 – 14 November 1956) was a Swedish sprinter who won a silver medal in the 4 × 100 m relay at the 1912 Summer Olympics. He failed to reach the finals of individual 100 m and 200 m events.

References

1892 births
1956 deaths
Swedish male sprinters
Olympic silver medalists for Sweden
Athletes (track and field) at the 1912 Summer Olympics
Olympic athletes of Sweden
Medalists at the 1912 Summer Olympics
Olympic silver medalists in athletics (track and field)
People from Kristianstad Municipality
Sportspeople from Skåne County
20th-century Swedish people